Is That Religion? is a 1930 satyrical American big band jazz song that incorporates elements of gospel music, including lyrics of the traditional Negro spiritual All God's Chillun Got Shoes. It was composed by Maceo Pinkard, with lyrics by Mitchell Parish.

1930 songs
Jazz songs
Songs with music by Maceo Pinkard
Songs with lyrics by Mitchell Parish
Cab Calloway songs
Duke Ellington songs
Mildred Bailey songs